Chris Urch is an English playwright. He trained at the Drama Centre as an actor, before turning to writing plays. His first full-length play Land of Our Fathers, set in a Welsh coalmine on the eve of the 1979 general election, received wide critical acclaim when it opened at Theatre503 in London in 2013. The play then transferred to the Trafalgar Theatre in the West End, before launching on a national tour.

Urch's next major play, The Rolling Stone, deals with the topic of violent homophobia in Uganda. It received its premiere at the Royal Exchange Theatre in Manchester in 2015 and then transferred to the Orange Tree Theatre in London. The play won the Bruntwood Prize for Playwriting in 2013, the Manchester Theatre Award for Best New Play in 2015, and Best New Play at the Off West End Awards 2017. The play opened at the off-broadway Mitzi E. Newhouse Theater in New York City in 2019.

Urch has also written a number of short plays, including You Get Me? (Bush Theatre), Talent (Soho Theatre), Skanky (Arcola), Married to the Game (Theatre 503), A Girl Like You (Latitude Festival) and G.L.O.R.Y (Canal Café Theatre)

Urch was born and grew up in Midsomer Norton in Somerset and became engaged to long term partner actor Jordan Mifsud in 2018. They currently reside in Bath.

References

English dramatists and playwrights
Living people
Year of birth missing (living people)
People from Midsomer Norton